WXJR-LP is a Variety formatted broadcast radio station licensed to Talking Rock, Georgia and serving Central Pickens County, Georgia.  WXJR-LP is owned and operated by Georgia Mountain Broadcasting Corporation.

References

External links
 WXJR Jasper Radio Online
 

2014 establishments in Georgia (U.S. state)
Variety radio stations in the United States
Radio stations established in 2014
XJR-LP
XJR-LP